Constitutional Commission elections were held in the Seychelles between 23 and 26 July 1992. They were the first multi-party elections since the 1977 coup had installed the Seychelles People's Progressive Front as the sole legal party. The commission was elected by proportional representation, with a threshold of 5% to win one of the 22 seats.

The SPPF emerged as the largest party with 14 of the representatives, whilst the remaining eight went to the Seychelles Democratic Party. Voter turnout was 85.3%.

Results

References

1992 in Seychelles
Elections in Seychelles
Seychelles
July 1992 events in Africa